Alan Raul Campos (born March 3, 1973)  is a former American football linebacker in the National Football League for the Dallas Cowboys. He played college football at the University of Louisville.

Early years
Campos attended Miami Palmetto High School, graduating in 1991. As a senior defensive lineman, he registered 70 tackles, while helping the team to a 9-3 record, a district championship and receiving All-Dade County honors. He accepted a football scholarship from the University of Louisville. In his first two seasons he played mainly on special teams.

As a junior, he became a starter at outside linebacker, posting 123 tackles (second on the team), 2 sacks, one interception, 2 forced fumbles and 3 fumble recoveries (one returned for a 23 yard touchdown). Against the United States Naval Academy, he made 22 tackles.

As a senior; he was the starter at strongside linebacker, finishing with 97 tackles (second on the team), 55 solo tackles, 2 sacks, 9 passes defensed, 3 forced fumbles and 3 interceptions (one returned for a 20 yard touchdown). Against the University of North Carolina, he had 15 tackles and rushed for 70 yards after executing a fake punt.

Professional career

Dallas Cowboys
Campos was selected by the Dallas Cowboys in the fifth round (167th overall) of the 1996 NFL Draft. As a rookie, he was a reserve player and tallied 9 special teams tackles (eighth on the team).

In 1997, he competed with rookie Dexter Coakley for the weakside linebacker starter role, that was available after Darrin Smith left in free agency. On August 25, he was waived to make room for cornerback Deion Sanders under the salary cap.

Indianapolis Colts
On July 29, 1998, Campos signed with the Indianapolis Colts as a free agent. He was waived on August 24.

Carolina Panthers
On July 13, 1999, he signed with the Carolina Panthers as a free agent. He was waived on September 3.

Scottish Claymores (NFLE)
Campos played with the Scottish Claymores of NFL Europe, where he was as a reserve linebacker during two seasons. He registered 9 tackles and one sack in 1998 and 2 sacks in 1999.

Carolina Cobras (AFL)
In 2000, Campos signed with the Carolina Cobras of the Arena Football League to play as a fullback/linebacker. Although he was not activated in the regular season until week 6, he finished tied for the team lead with 7 rushing touchdowns. He was released on April 9, 2001.

References

1973 births
Living people
Miami Palmetto Senior High School alumni
Players of American football from Miami
American football linebackers
Louisville Cardinals football players
Dallas Cowboys players
Scottish Claymores players
Carolina Cobras players